Gagi is a small village in Kanke  blocks of Ranchi, India.

References

Villages in Ranchi district